Oakleigh Park railway station serves Oakleigh Park in the London Borough of Barnet, north London, England. The station is managed and served by Great Northern.

Oyster pay as you go can now be used to and from this station as well as on the majority of National Rail services in Greater London. Customers should touch in and touch out at the validators provided to ensure they are charged the correct fare.

History 

In 1866 the Whetstone Park Company, promoters of the Whetstone Park Estate, reached an agreement with the Great Northern Railway (GNR) to construct a new station to serve the development. The station – to be known as Whetstone – would open once 25 houses were complete, although the GNR built the two station platforms immediately (they were completed by June 1866).

Contact between the developer and the GNR took place in January 1869, then again in summer 1871 by which time the development had been renamed to the Oakleigh Park Estate, but it was not until January 1873 that the developer was able to inform the GNR that the 25th house was complete. Accordingly, the GNR authorised the station to be completed, now to be known as Oakleigh Park. It opened to passenger traffic on 1 December 1873. The estate office was situated in Chandos Avenue; a contemporaneous sign advertising "Oakleigh Park on main line. Detached residences – gravel soil – open country – large plots – moderate prices" is displayed in the London Transport Museum in Covent Garden.

As part of works to increase the number of tracks from two to four, the station was completely rebuilt in 1891–2 with two island platforms, a new footbridge and booking office. The 1873 station footbridge at the extreme north end of the station was retained as a public footpath, but with the stairs to the station removed.

The station remained largely unchanged until around 1975, when alterations were made in readiness for electrification. By the 1930s the station had gained the suffix For East Barnet, which remained until at least the 1970s.
The first holes were bored near the station for the overhead powerline in order to electrify the East Coast Main Line.

Facilities

In Autumn 2008, a new SHERE self-service ticket machine, accepting both cash and credit cards, was installed here (and similarly at other local FCC stations). The station is made up of two island platforms, with platforms 1 and 2 serving southbound trains to Moorgate and King's Cross and platforms 3 and 4 serving northbound trains to Welwyn Garden City.

Services
Off-peak, all services at Oakleigh Park are operated by Great Northern using  EMUs.

The typical off-peak service in trains per hour is:
 2 tph to 
 2 tph to 

During the peak hours, the service is increased to 4 tph in each direction.

The station is also served by a small number of Thameslink operated services to and from  via the Thameslink Core. These services are operated using  EMUs.

Connections
Transport for London bus route 383 stops directly outside Oakleigh Park railway station, as well as operating a Hail and Ride service along Netherlands Road and Oakleigh Park North/Athenaeum Road. Buses run towards Barnet, The Spires or towards Finchley Memorial Hospital, every 30 minutes Mondays to Saturdays except late evenings. London Bus route 184 stops nearby, but not at the station

Nature reserve
Immediately to the south of the station is Oakleigh Park Rail Cutting, a Site of Local Importance for Nature Conservation.

References

External links 

 Timetables for Oakleigh Park from First Capital Connect

Railway stations in the London Borough of Barnet
DfT Category D stations
Former Great Northern Railway stations
Railway stations in Great Britain opened in 1873
Railway stations served by Govia Thameslink Railway
Oakleigh Park